Faldarlı (also, Faldar and Faldarly) is a village and municipality in the Zaqatala Rayon of Azerbaijan.  It has a population of 1,767.

References 

Populated places in Zaqatala District